C standard may refer to:

 ANSI C, C99, C11, C17, or C2x, specifications of the C programming language
 C standard library
 C tuning (guitar), a type of tuning for guitars